Hilarographa castanea is a species of moth of the family Tortricidae. It is found in the East Cordillera of Ecuador.

The wingspan is about 20 mm. The wings are ferruginous brown, but dark brown in the terminal area. The ground colour is reduced to yellowish cream oblique lines. The hindwings are rust brown, but dark and more brown on the periphery.

Etymology
The specific name refers to the colouration of the forewing and is derived from Latin castaneus (meaning bronze).

References

Moths described in 2009
Hilarographini